Chirakkal Kalidasan (born ) is a famous Asian elephant. He is the tallest elephant in India. He is famous for his huge fan base and he acted a major role in the film Bahubali. He is also known as Gajaraja Bahubali.

Early life 
Kalidasan was born wild in Karnataka forests. Chirakkal Kalidasan is a male Asian elephant (Elephas maximus). He was brought into Kerala by Manissey Hari and was later bought by Chirakkal Madhu in the 2000s.

Recognisations 
Kalidasan is a star elephant in Malayalam cinema.

Movies 
Kalidasan is known for acting in movies, notably in the 2017 epic film, Baahubali 2: The Conclusion. He has also acted in the movies Pattabhishekham, Punyalan Agarbattis and Dil Se...

Video album 
In 2018, he acted in a musical video called "Gajam", sung by Vijay Yesudas.

Others 
In 2020, he became a part of the promo video by Indian Super League club Kerala Blasters.

In the early 2010s, he was given the name Junior Thechikkot by elephant lovers.

Kalidasan is also known for taking part in photoshoots with actors and models.

See also 
 Chengalloor Dakshayani
 List of individual elephants

References

1980 animal births
Elephants in Hinduism
Individual elephants
Elephants in Indian culture
Individual animals in India
Elephants in Kerala
Animal actors